Athletes from the Islamic Republic of Iran competed at the 2000 Summer Paralympics in Sydney, Australia.

Competitors

Medal summary

Medal table

Medalists

Results by event

Archery

Men's recurve

Athletics

Men

Women

Powerlifting

Men

Shooting

Men

Women

Mixed

Volleyball

Men's sitting

References
International Paralympic Committee

Nations at the 2000 Summer Paralympics
2000
Paralympics